Alpine Lake is a lake in Mono County, California, in the United States.

Alpine Lake was named for its lofty elevation.

See also
List of lakes in California

References

Lakes of California
Lakes of Mono County, California
Lakes of Northern California